The Treaty of Batum was signed in Batum on 4 June 1918, between the Ottoman Empire and the three Transcaucasian states: the First Republic of Armenia, the Azerbaijan Democratic Republic and the Democratic Republic of Georgia. It was the first treaty of the First Republic of Armenia and the Azerbaijan Democratic Republic and had 14 articles.

Background

On 5 December 1917, the armistice of Erzincan was signed between the Russians and the Ottomans, ending the armed conflicts between Russia and the Ottoman Empire in the Persian Campaign and Caucasus Campaign of the Middle Eastern theatre of World War I. On 3 March 1918, the armistice of Erzincan was followed up with the Treaty of Brest-Litovsk marking Russia's exit from World War I. Between 14 March and April 1918, the Trabzon peace conference was held between the Ottoman Empire and the delegation of the Transcaucasian Diet (Transcaucasian Sejm). Enver Pasha offered to surrender all ambitions in the Caucasus in return for recognition of the Ottoman reacquisition of the east Anatolian provinces at Brest-Litovsk at the end of the negotiations. On 5 April, the head of the Transcaucasian delegation Akaki Chkhenkeli accepted the Treaty of Brest-Litovsk as a basis for more negotiations and wired the governing bodies urging them to accept that position. The mood prevailing in Tiflis was very different. The Armenians pressured the Republic to refuse and acknowledged the existence of a state of war between themselves and the Ottoman Empire. Hostilities resumed, and the Ottoman troops overran new lands to the east, reaching the prewar borders. Approximately 40,000 civilians perished during the retreat of Armenian-Georgian volunteers and the Ottoman advance. According to Clarence Ussher, an American doctor in eastern Anatolia, the number of Armenians killed during the Russian retreat numbered 7,000.

Treaty 
On 11 May, a new peace conference opened at Batum. the Ottomans extended their demands to include Tiflis as well as Alexandropol and Echmiadzin; they also wanted a railroad to be built to connect Kars and Julfa with Baku. The new Armenian state, through which the transport corridor would run, was to give free right of passage. The Armenian and Georgian members of the Republic’s delegation began to stall. Beginning on 21 May, the Ottoman army moved ahead once again into areas of Russian Armenia that had not been under the sultan's control since the 17th century. The conflict led to the Battle of Sardarapat (21–29 May), the Battle of Karakilisa (24–28 May), and the Battle of Bash Abaran (21–24 May).

The treaty was signed while the Third Army held positions 7 km from Yerevan and only 10 km from Echmiadzin. The treaty needed to be examined and confirmed by the Central Powers. Fifteen days after the treaty, delegates from Armenia were asked to come to Constantinople. In the surrendered territories the majority of the 1,250,000 pre-war inhabitants had been Armenians, with more than 400,000 in the ceded sector of Yerevan province alone.

Signatories
Ottoman side:
 Halil Menteshe – Minister of Justice
 Wehib Pasha – commander of the Third Army during the Caucasus Campaign
Armenian side:
 Avetis Aharonian – Chairman of the Armenian National Council
 Alexander Khatisian – Minister of Foreign Affairs
 M. Babachanian
 Ghorghanian
Azerbaijani side:
 Mammad Amin Rasulzade – President of Azerbaijani National Council
 Mammad Hasan Hajinski – Minister of Foreign Affairs
Georgian side:
 Akaki Chkhenkeli – Foreign Minister

Statistics

References 

Batum
Batum
1918 in Armenia
1918 in Azerbaijan
Batum
Batum
Batum
Armenia–Turkey relations
1918 in the Ottoman Empire
Batum
1918 in Georgia (country)
History of Adjara
Ottoman period in Georgia (country)